Stephen Murphy (born 23 September 1969) is an Irish former professional snooker player.

Murphy was a 10-year pro from 1989 to 1999.

He reached the last 32 of the 1992 Snooker World championship. He lost 10–3 at the crucible to multiple world champion Stephen Hendry.

In October 1996 Murphy represented Ireland at the World Cup. Three-man teams with one sub from all over the globe took part at the Armari Watergate Hotel in Bangkok. The Irish team consisted of Murphy along with Ken Doherty,  Fergal O'Brien and Michael Judge as sub. Ireland beat Canada to earn a semi-final with England. The England team was made up of Peter Ebdon, Nigel Bond and Ronnie O'Sullivan but lost 10–9. Ireland faced a Scotland team of Hendry, John Higgins and Alan McManus in the final and lost 10–6.

Despite returning to Dublin upon retirement, Murphy would visit to watch his friend Doherty play at future World Championships.

References

Irish snooker players
Living people
1969 births
Sportspeople from Dublin (city)